Pelouse is a commune in the Lozère département in southern France.

Geography
The Colagne forms part of the commune's northern border.

See also
Communes of the Lozère department

References

Communes of Lozère